The Fraser Valley Trade and Exhibition Centre or TRADEX is the second largest facility of its kind in Abbotsford, British Columbia, Canada.

It is operated by the Tourism Abbotsford Society and hosts around 90 events every year. These events are run by independent companies or people (show managers) who are subject to TRADEX policies and procedures. The events vary in type and include consumer shows, trade shows, banquets, agricultural shows, special events, meetings, sporting events, outdoor events, weddings, product launches, film shoots, and ride and drives.

The building has an H-shaped layout of two  halls which can be used independently or for a single large exhibition.

The centre hosts the bulk of its events between September to May, during which time events are run almost every weekend. During the rest of the year, the centre hosts fewer events, mostly held outdoors.

History 

The centre was constructed as a joint project between the BC Pavilion Corporation (BC PavCo) the Provincial Government, the Municipal Government and Airshow Canada, and was completed in 1991. It was managed by BC PavCo until 2003 when the centre was purchased by the City of Abbotsford and Tourism Abbotsford contracted to take over the operation of the centre.

Additional information 

In addition to 120,000 total square feet of exhibition space, TRADEX has:

 Three additional meeting rooms, of varying sizes
 A show office with a private meeting room/lounge
 One loading bay with two loading bay doors
 Fully licensed catering facilities from fast food concessions to banquet for 2,500 people per hall
 A two level food concession area totalling , with seating for 500 people
  of paved, gravel and grass parking lot area, totalling 2,500 parking stalls, with over 1,000 being paved

External links 

Buildings and structures in Abbotsford, British Columbia
Convention centres in Canada